Nothobranchius neumanni is a species of killifish in the family Nothobranchiidae. It is endemic to Tanzania.  It occurs in both perennial and seasonal wetlands including rivers, lakes and ponds where it most likely feeds on planktonic crustaceans. This species was described as Fundulus neumanni by Franz Hilgendorf in 1905. The specific name honours Hilgendorf's companion on some of his expeditions to Africa, the German ornithologist Oscar Neumann (1867-1946).

References

Fauna of Tanzania
neumanni
Taxonomy articles created by Polbot
Taxa named by Franz Martin Hilgendorf
Fish described in 1905